Dyschirius montanus is a species of ground beetle in the subfamily Scaritinae. It was described by John Lawrence LeConte in 1879.

References

montanus
Beetles described in 1879